The Armstrong Siddeley Mongoose is a British five-cylinder radial aero engine produced by Armstrong Siddeley. Developed in the mid-1920s it was used in the Hawker Tomtit trainer and Parnall Peto seaplane amongst others. With a displacement of 540 cubic inches (9 litres) the Mongoose had a maximum power output of 155 horsepower (115 kilowatts).

A Mongoose engine powers the sole remaining airworthy Hawker Tomtit, based at Old Warden.

Design and development
The Mongoose is a five-cylinder, single-row, air-cooled radial piston engine. The engine features twin forward-mounted ignition magnetos and enclosed valve rockers, the cylinders being the same as those used for the earlier Jaguar engine. An unusual feature of the Mongoose is the vertical position of the lower cylinder, a design thought likely to promote oil fouling of the spark plugs.

Built in several variants, power output ranged between 135 and 155 hp (100-115 kW).

Variants
Mongoose I 
1926, 135 hp.
Mongoose II
1930, 155 hp.
Mongoose III 
1929.
Mongoose IIIA
1929, civil use.
Mongoose IIIC 
1929, Military use based on IIIA.

Applications

Note:
Avro 504N
Avro 504R
Avro Tutor
Avro Type 621 Trainer
Handley Page Hamlet
Handley Page Gugnunc 
Hawker Tomtit
Parnall Peto
Fokker S.IV

Survivors
An Armstrong Siddeley Mongoose IIIC powers the sole remaining airworthy Hawker Tomtit, K1786/G-AFTA, owned and operated by the Shuttleworth Collection this aircraft flies regularly throughout the summer months.

Specifications (Mongoose I)

See also

References

Notes

Bibliography

 Gunston, Bill. World Encyclopaedia of Aero Engines. Cambridge, England. Patrick Stephens Limited, 1989. 
 Lumsden, Alec. British Piston Engines and their Aircraft. Marlborough, Wiltshire: Airlife Publishing, 2003. .

External links

Armstrong Siddeley Mongoose - Flight, July 1929

Aircraft air-cooled radial piston engines
Mongoose
1920s aircraft piston engines